Patrick Deville (born 14 December 1957 in Saint-Brevin-les-Pins) is a French writer.

Life
After studying comparative literature and philosophy at the University of Nantes, Deville lived in the Middle East, Nigeria and Algeria. In the 1990s, he travelled frequently to Cuba and Uruguay.

In 1996, he created the literary review Meet.

In 2011, the editors of Lire magazine selected Kampuchea as the best French novel of the year.

In 2012, his novel Plague and Cholera (based on the life of the bacteriologist Alexandre Yersin) was one of the most discussed books of the literary season. It was a finalist for several French prizes, and received both the Fnac Prize and the Prix Femina.

His books have been translated into a dozen languages.

Works
Œnologie et crus des vins, with Roger Piallat, Éditions Jérôme Villette 1996 (rééd. Kilien Stengel, 2008).
Cordon-bleu, Editions de Minuit 1987 
Das Perspektiv. Rowohlt Verlag GmbH, 1989, 
El Catalejo, Translator Javier Albiñana, Anagrama, 1990, 
Le Feu d'artifice, Editions de Minuit 1992  (The Fireworks) 
 Los Fuegos artificiales, Edicions 62, 1994, 
花火, 白水社, 1994, 
La Femme parfaite,, Editions de Minuit 1995 (The Perfect Woman) 
Ces deux-là, Editions de Minuit, 2000  (These Two) 
Pura vida: vie & mort de William Walker, Seuil, 2004 (Pure Life: Life and death of William Walker) 
Pura vida: Vida y muerte de William Walker, Seix Barral, 2005, 
La Tentation des armes à feu, Seuil, 2006  (The Temptation of Firearms) 
Equatoria, Seuil, 2009,  
Kampuchéa, Seuil, 2011, 
Vie et mort sainte Tina l'exilée, editions publie.net, 2011 (Life and Holy Death in Exile Tina)
Peste et Choléra, Seuil, 2012. [Plague and Cholera] 
Viva, Seuil, 2014. 
Taba-Taba, Seuil, 2017.
Amazonia, Seuil, 2019.

Notes and references

External links

1957 births
Living people
People from Loire-Atlantique
20th-century French novelists
21st-century French novelists
Writers from Pays de la Loire
University of Nantes alumni
Prix Femina winners
French male novelists
20th-century French male writers
21st-century French male writers